Lampetis is a genus of beetles in the family Buprestidae, containing the following species:

 Lampetis abbreviata (Lucas, 1859)
 Lampetis abdita (Kerremans, 1919)
 Lampetis achardi (Obenberger, 1928)
 Lampetis adonis (Obenberger, 1924)
 Lampetis aemula (Kerremans, 1919)
 Lampetis aequistriata (Obenberger, 1924)
 Lampetis affinis Saunders, 1866
 Lampetis afra (Obenberger, 1924)
 Lampetis albicincta (Reiche, 1850)
 Lampetis albidopilosa (Nonfried, 1894)
 Lampetis albomarginata (Herbst, 1801)
 Lampetis albosparsa (Fairmaire, 1869)
 Lampetis alluaudi (Kerremans, 1893)
 Lampetis alutacea (Obenberger, 1924)
 Lampetis alvarengai (Cobos, 1972)
 Lampetis amaurotica (Klug, 1855)
 Lampetis angolensis (Kerremans, 1910)
 Lampetis apiata (Kerremans, 1897)
 Lampetis arabica (Gahan, 1895)
 Lampetis argentata (Mannerheim, 1837)
 Lampetis argentosparsa (Perty, 1830)
 Lampetis aspasia (Gerstäcker, 1884)
 Lampetis aurata (Saunders, 1871)
 Lampetis aurifer (Olivier, 1790)
 Lampetis aurolimbata (Laporte & Gory, 1836)
 Lampetis auropunctata (Kerremans, 1893)
 Lampetis baeri (Kerremans, 1910)
 Lampetis bahamica (Fisher, 1925)
 Lampetis bahiana (Kerremans, 1897)
 Lampetis baliana (Kerremans, 1900)
 Lampetis bayeti (Théry, 1937)
 Lampetis beatricis (Obenberger, 1943)
 Lampetis bennigseni (Kerremans, 1899)
 Lampetis bioculata (Olivier, 1790)
 Lampetis bottegoi (Kerremans, 1910)
 Lampetis bouyeri Leonard, 2009
 Lampetis bremei (Fairmaire, 1869)
 Lampetis bruchiana (Obenberger, 1928)
 Lampetis burgeoni Bellamy, 1998
 Lampetis burlinii Cobos, 1963
 Lampetis cacica Chevrolat, 1838
 Lampetis caeruleitarsis (Saunders, 1871)
 Lampetis callimicra (Kerremans, 1893)
 Lampetis campanae (Kerremans, 1910)
 Lampetis carpenteri (Théry, 1930)
 Lampetis catenulata (Klug, 1829)
 Lampetis chalconota (Waterhouse, 1882)
 Lampetis chamela Corona, 2005
 Lampetis chiapaneca Corona, 2004
 Lampetis chlorizans (Obenberger, 1917)
 Lampetis chlorogastra (Obenberger, 1940)
 Lampetis christophi Théry, 1923
 Lampetis chromatopus (Obenberger, 1928)
 Lampetis cicatricosa (Kerremans, 1897)
 Lampetis cleta (Gory, 1840)
 Lampetis colima Corona, 2005
 Lampetis commixta (Obenberger, 1924)
 Lampetis comorica (Mannerheim, 1837)
 Lampetis comottoi (Lansberge, 1885)
 Lampetis confinis (Kerremans, 1898)
 Lampetis confluens (Harold, 1878)
 Lampetis confossipennis (Fairmaire, 1884)
 Lampetis conturbata (Thomson, 1879)
 Lampetis coquerelii (Fairmaire, 1869)
 Lampetis corinthia (Fairmaire, 1864)
 Lampetis corruscans (Carter, 1924)
 Lampetis cortesi (Laporte & Gory, 1837)
 Lampetis costicella Thomson, 1879
 Lampetis crassicollis Thomson, 1879
 Lampetis cuneiformis Théry, 1923
 Lampetis cupreata (Laporte & Gory, 1836)
 Lampetis cupreoaenea (Latreille, 1803)
 Lampetis cupreopunctata (Schaeffer, 1905)
 Lampetis cupreosparsa (Lucas, 1859)
 Lampetis cupreosplendens (Saunders, 1871)
 Lampetis curvipes Chevrolat, 1838
 Lampetis cyaneomaculifer (Künckel d'Herculais, 1890)
 Lampetis cyanipes (Lucas, 1859)
 Lampetis cyanitarsis Corona, 2005
 Lampetis cyclops (Théry, 1905)
 Lampetis cylindrica (Harold, 1878)
 Lampetis decorsei (Théry, 1905)
 Lampetis dejongi Bellamy, 2008
 Lampetis derosa (Gory, 1840)
 Lampetis desmarestii Thomson, 1878
 Lampetis devillei (Lucas, 1859)
 Lampetis dilaticollis (Waterhouse, 1882)
 Lampetis dilecta Thomson, 1878
 Lampetis dives (Germar, 1824)
 Lampetis doncherii (Gory, 1840)
 Lampetis drummondi (Laporte & Gory, 1836)
 Lampetis dumetorum (Gory, 1840)
 Lampetis egeria (Obenberger, 1924)
 Lampetis elegans (Nonfried, 1894)
 Lampetis embrikstrandella (Obenberger, 1936)
 Lampetis erosa (Harold, 1878)
 Lampetis ertli (Hoscheck, 1918)
 Lampetis eugastra (Obenberger, 1928)
 Lampetis exophthalma (Guérin-Méneville, 1832)
 Lampetis fahrei (Obenberger, 1928)
 Lampetis famula Chevrolat, 1838
 Lampetis fastuosa (Fabricius, 1775)
 Lampetis favareli (Le Moult, 1939)
 Lampetis fernandezyepezi Cobos, 1959
 Lampetis flavocincta (Kerremans, 1894)
 Lampetis foveicollis (Gory, 1840)
 Lampetis frici (Obenberger, 1917)
 Lampetis frontalis (Kerremans, 1897)
 Lampetis funesta (Fabricius, 1793)
 Lampetis gemmifera (Laporte & Gory, 1837)
 Lampetis geniculata (Waterhouse, 1889)
 Lampetis germaini (Kerremans, 1911)
 Lampetis gerstaeckerii (Thomson, 1879)
 Lampetis gibbosa (Kerremans, 1919)
 Lampetis gobabisensis Krajcik, 2009
 Lampetis gorgo (Obenberger, 1924)
 Lampetis gorilla (Thomson, 1858)
 Lampetis gounellei (Kerremans, 1897)
 Lampetis grandiosa (Obenberger, 1924)
 Lampetis granulifera (Laporte & Gory, 1837)
 Lampetis gregaria (Fåhraeus in Boheman, 1851)
 Lampetis guildini (Laporte & Gory, 1836)
 Lampetis guningi (Kerremans, 1911)
 Lampetis guttulata (Kraatz, 1898)
 Lampetis handschini (Obenberger, 1932)
 Lampetis helenae Krajcik, 2007
 Lampetis hercules (Thomson, 1879)
 Lampetis hilarii (Gory, 1840)
 Lampetis hirtomaculata (Herbst, 1801)
 Lampetis holynskii Akiyama & Ohmomo, 1994
 Lampetis hondurensis Corona, 2005
 Lampetis imitator (Kerremans, 1910)
 Lampetis impressa (Harold, 1878)
 Lampetis impressicollis (Lucas, 1859)
 Lampetis inaequalis (Fairmaire, 1884)
 Lampetis indigoventris (Obenberger, 1928)
 Lampetis inedita (Laporte & Gory, 1836)
 Lampetis infralaevis (Kerremans, 1911)
 Lampetis infraviridis (Kerremans, 1893)
 Lampetis insolens (Kerremans, 1919)
 Lampetis instabilis (Laporte & Gory, 1836)
 Lampetis intermedia (Kerremans, 1898)
 Lampetis iris Théry, 1926
 Lampetis ivalouae Bellamy, 1998
 Lampetis jakobsoni (Obenberger, 1928)
 Lampetis jakovlevi (Obenberger, 1928)
 Lampetis jeanneli (Kerremans, 1914)
 Lampetis jutrzenckai (Obenberger, 1928)
 Lampetis kadleci Krajcik, 2009
 Lampetis kheili (Obenberger, 1924)
 Lampetis kolbei (Kerremans, 1910)
 Lampetis kraciki (Obenberger, 1924)
 Lampetis landeri Akiyama & Ohmomo, 1994
 Lampetis laplatensis Thomson, 1879
 Lampetis lateoculata (Fairmaire, 1891)
 Lampetis lesnei (Kerremans, 1910)
 Lampetis lethalis Thomson, 1879
 Lampetis limbalis (Laporte & Gory, 1837)
 Lampetis lomii (Obenberger, 1940)
 Lampetis macarthuri (Théry, 1941)
 Lampetis manglbergeri (Hoscheck, 1918)
 Lampetis manipurensis (Nonfried, 1893)
 Lampetis maraguana (Obenberger, 1936)
 Lampetis margaritacea Thomson, 1879
 Lampetis mariae (Cobos, 1972)
 Lampetis massarti (Théry, 1937)
 Lampetis media Bellamy, 1998
 Lampetis medusa (Obenberger, 1924)
 Lampetis melancholica (Fabricius, 1798)
 Lampetis mexicana Théry, 1923
 Lampetis mimosae (Klug, 1829)
 Lampetis miranda (Kerremans, 1919)
 Lampetis mogadisciana Obenberger, 1940
 Lampetis monilis Chevrolat, 1834
 Lampetis monoglypta (Lansberge, 1887)
 Lampetis montana (Kerremans, 1910)
 Lampetis morbillosa (Olivier, 1790)
 Lampetis muata (Harold, 1878)
 Lampetis muataeformis (Obenberger, 1916)
 Lampetis muelleri (Obenberger, 1940)
 Lampetis mysteriosa (Obenberger, 1917)
 Lampetis nataliae Krajcik, 2008
 Lampetis nelsoni Akiyama & Ohmomo, 1994
 Lampetis nigrita (Fairmaire, 1882)
 Lampetis nigritorum (Laporte & Gory, 1837)
 Lampetis nigroviolacea Thomson, 1878
 Lampetis nitidissima (Kerremans, 1899)
 Lampetis novata Thomson, 1879
 Lampetis nyassica (Kerremans, 1899)
 Lampetis obenbergeri (Hoscheck, 1918)
 Lampetis obscura Thomson, 1879
 Lampetis obscurata (Saunders, 1871)
 Lampetis ocelligera Thomson, 1879
 Lampetis oculicollis (Laporte & Gory, 1836)
 Lampetis ophthalmica (Klug, 1855)
 Lampetis orientalis (Laporte & Gory, 1837)
 Lampetis ornata (Obst, 1903)
 Lampetis paradoxa (Kerremans, 1919)
 Lampetis paraguayensis (Obenberger, 1924)
 Lampetis pater (Théry, 1905)
 Lampetis patruelis (Fairmaire, 1869)
 Lampetis peraffinis (Fairmaire, 1869)
 Lampetis perforata (Obenberger, 1928)
 Lampetis persica (Kerremans, 1910)
 Lampetis perspicillata (Klug, 1855)
 Lampetis peruana (Obenberger, 1928)
 Lampetis piger (Laporte & Gory, 1836)
 Lampetis pilosomaculata (Mannerheim, 1837)
 Lampetis placida (Boheman, 1860)
 Lampetis plagiata (Gory, 1840)
 Lampetis plagicollis (Boheman, 1860)
 Lampetis polymorpha (Théry, 1946)
 Lampetis posthuma (Obenberger, 1926)
 Lampetis prasinifrons (Obenberger, 1917)
 Lampetis principalis (Laporte & Gory, 1836)
 Lampetis problematica (Obenberger, 1917)
 Lampetis prognostica (Obenberger, 1924)
 Lampetis psilopteroides Saunders, 1866
 Lampetis pulverea (Laporte & Gory, 1837)
 Lampetis punctatissima (Fabricius, 1775)
 Lampetis punctatostriata (Laporte & Gory, 1836)
 Lampetis puncticollis Saunders, 1866
 Lampetis pupillata (Klug, 1855)
 Lampetis purpureomicans (Kerremans, 1893)
 Lampetis quadriareolata (Fåhraeus in Boheman, 1851)
 Lampetis quadrioculata (Kerremans, 1893)
 Lampetis raffrayi (Thomson, 1879)
 Lampetis revilliodi (Théry, 1946)
 Lampetis ritsemae (Lansberge, 1886)
 Lampetis roseocarinata Thomson, 1878
 Lampetis rudicollis (Gory, 1840)
 Lampetis rugosa (Palisot de Beauvois, 1807)
 Lampetis rugulosa (Laporte & Gory, 1837)
 Lampetis sanghana (Kerremans, 1910)
 Lampetis scabiosa (Kerremans, 1910)
 Lampetis scapha (Kerremans, 1919)
 Lampetis schenklingi (Kerremans, 1908)
 Lampetis scintillans (Waterhouse, 1877)
 Lampetis semenovi (Obenberger, 1928)
 Lampetis senegalensis (Laporte & Gory, 1837)
 Lampetis separata (Kerremans, 1909)
 Lampetis sergenti (Laporte & Gory, 1837)
 Lampetis seriata (Mannerheim, 1837)
 Lampetis shanensis Hornburg, 2004
 Lampetis sikumbae (Obenberger, 1924)
 Lampetis simplex (Waterhouse, 1882)
 Lampetis smaragdina (Obenberger, 1917)
 Lampetis solieri (Lucas, 1859)
 Lampetis spissiformis Thomson, 1879
 Lampetis srdinkoana (Obenberger, 1924)
 Lampetis stictica (Kerremans, 1900)
 Lampetis straba (Chevrolat, 1867)
 Lampetis strandiana (Obenberger, 1924)
 Lampetis subcacica (Kerremans, 1910)
 Lampetis subcatenulata Thomson, 1879
 Lampetis subcylindrica (Théry, 1926)
 Lampetis suberosa (Théry, 1937)
 Lampetis subparallela (Laporte & Gory, 1837)
 Lampetis sulciventris (Obenberger, 1928)
 Lampetis sycophanta (Fairmaire, 1869)
 Lampetis taborana (Kerremans, 1910)
 Lampetis tibiosa (Obenberger, 1926)
 Lampetis tigrina Corona, 2005
 Lampetis timoriensis (Laporte & Gory, 1837)
 Lampetis torquata (Dalman, 1823)
 Lampetis transvaalensis (Thomson, 1879)
 Lampetis tristis (Linnaeus, 1758)
 Lampetis tucumana (Guérin-Méneville & Percheron, 1835)
 Lampetis umbrosa (Fabricius, 1793)
 Lampetis uthmoelleri (Obenberger, 1940)
 Lampetis valreasi (Théry, 1905)
 Lampetis vana (Fåhraeus in Boheman, 1851)
 Lampetis variolosa (Fabricius, 1801)
 Lampetis vedyi (Théry, 1937)
 Lampetis vicina (Kerremans, 1919)
 Lampetis viridans (Kerremans, 1893)
 Lampetis viridicolor Corona, 2005
 Lampetis viridicornis (Künckel d'Herculais, 1890)
 Lampetis viridicuprea Saunders, 1866
 Lampetis viridimarginalis Corona, 2005
 Lampetis viridimarginata (Fåhraeus in Boheman, 1851)
 Lampetis vulcanica (Obenberger, 1924)
 Lampetis vulnerata (Kerremans, 1897)
 Lampetis webbii (LeConte, 1858)
 Lampetis weddelii (Lucas, 1859)
 Lampetis weigelti (Pongrácz, 1935)
 Lampetis wellmani (Kerremans, 1908)
 Lampetis werneri Krajcik, 2009
 Lampetis zambesica (Obenberger, 1928)
 Lampetis zona (Thomson, 1858)

References

Buprestidae genera